Iain Wilson (born 15 December 1998) is a Scottish footballer who plays as a midfielder for Queen of the South. Wilson has previously played for Kilmarnock, Dunfermline Athletic and Greenock Morton. Wilson also had two previous loan spells at the Doonhamers and has also represented Scotland from under-17 to under-21 levels.

Club career
On 6 December 2016, Wilson debuted for Kilmarnock as a half-time in a match versus Aberdeen in a 5-1 defeat. On 29 January 2019, Wilson was loaned out to Queen of the South for the remainder of the 2018-19 season. In January 2020, Wilson returned to the Dumfries club for a second loan spell.

In July 2020, Wilson departed Killie and signed for Dunfermline Athletic on a two-year deal. On 30 January 2022, Wilson departed the Pars by mutual consent  and the following day signed for Greenock Morton until the end of the 2021-22 season.

On 2 June 2022, Wilson signed a two-year contract for Queen of the South, having previously had two loan spells at Palmerston.

International career

Selected for the Scotland under-20 squad in the 2017 Toulon Tournament, Wilson played as Scotland beat Brazil under-20s 1–0, which was the nations first ever win against Brazil at any level. The team went on to claim the bronze medal. It was the nations first ever medal at the competition.

Selected for the under-21 squad in the 2018 Toulon Tournament. They lost to Turkey under-21s in a penalty-out and finished fourth.

Career statistics

References

External links
 
 

1998 births
Living people
Scottish footballers
Kilmarnock F.C. players
Queen of the South F.C. players
Dunfermline Athletic F.C. players
Scottish Professional Football League players
Scotland youth international footballers
Scotland under-21 international footballers
Association football midfielders
Greenock Morton F.C. players